Mark Szücs (born November 4, 1976 in Toronto, Ontario) is a Canadian-born Austrian former professional ice hockey left winger. 

Szücs spent four seasons in Union College before moving to Austria in 1999 with VEU Feldkirch. In 2000 he moved to EHC Black Wings Linz where he remained until his retirement in 2010, playing over 400 games for the team. He has worked as an assistant coach for Linz since retiring as a player.

He became an Austrian citizen and played for the Austria national team in the 2002, 2003 and 2004 IIHF World Championship.

Career statistics

External links

1976 births
Living people
Austrian ice hockey players
Canadian ice hockey right wingers
EHC Black Wings Linz players
Ice hockey people from Toronto
Union Dutchmen ice hockey players
VEU Feldkirch players
Canadian expatriate ice hockey players in Austria